() is the generic term in German for institutions of higher education, corresponding to universities and colleges in English. The term Universität (plural: Universitäten) is reserved for institutions with the right to confer doctorates. In contrast, Hochschule encompasses Universitäten as well as institutions that are not authorized to confer doctorates.

Generic term 
The German education system knows two different types of universities, which do not have the same legal status. The term Hochschule can be used to refer to all institutions of higher education in Germany that confer academic degrees, that is both regular universities (Universitäten) and Fachhochschulen.

Specialised term 
Rather than as an umbrella term, Hochschule is also increasingly used as a specialized term, i.e. for institutions that:
 do not cover a large diversity of academic fields, but focus on certain areas;
 do not have the right to award doctorates, but bachelor's degrees and master's degrees.

Institutions that are called Hochschule meet one or more of these criteria, which differentiate them from an Universität. In recent years, a number of German Fachhochschulen opted to name themselves Hochschule or Hochschule für angewandte Wissenschaften (university of applied sciences) rather than Fachhochschule. Additionally, there are specialized Hochschulen which focus on a particular set of disciplines, e.g., Kunsthochschulen (art schools), and share the same legal status as regular universities.

However the state of Baden-Württemberg, from where this type of tertiary sector education originally emerged, has recently elevated these institutions to the status of a Hochschule as Baden-Württemberg Cooperative State University. The degrees awarded by the latter are academic degrees and equivalent to those awarded by Fachhochschulen and regular universities.

See also 

References 

German words and phrases
Higher education in Germany
Types of university or college